
Lac d'Icogne is a reservoir in the municipality of Lens near the village of Crans-sur-Sierre in the canton of Valais, Switzerland.

History 
The reservoir was built in 1963 in order to improve the use of the irrigation water coming from Mont-Lachaux.

In 2006, the municipality of Icogne started a Micro hydro project using the overflow of the lake in order to produce electricity.
Even if the municipality of Icogne was the owner of the lake and the water, the project was delayed by negotiations with the neighboring municipality of Lens on which the lake is located.
The hydro-power plant was inaugurated in May 2012.

References

Lakes of Valais
Reservoirs in Switzerland